Eulithis destinata is a species of geometrid moth in the family Geometridae. It is found in North America.

The MONA or Hodges number for Eulithis destinata is 7204.

References

Further reading

 
 

Cidariini
Moths described in 1860